Montgomery railway station served the town of Montgomery, Powys, Wales between 1861 and 1965.

History
The Oswestry and Newtown Railway (O&NR) was authorised in 1855, and opened in stages.

It had two platforms which were slightly staggered, and the station building was on the northern side; there were also a signal box and goods shed.

In June 1864, the O&NR amalgamated with several other companies to form the Cambrian Railways. As part of the 1923 Grouping, the Cambrian amalgamated with the Great Western Railway.

The station was closed by British Railways on 14 June 1965, along with many other wayside stations on the route (as a result of the Beeching Axe).  Much of the infrastructure survived after closure however, including the signal box, eastbound platform, goods shed and main station buildings.  The box was decommissioned and removed (along with the passing loop here) in 1969, but the other structures still stand today: the main building is a private house and the goods shed is in commercial use).

Notes

References

Further reading

External links
Montgomery Station on navigable 1949 O.S. map
Disused Stations - Montgomery

Disused railway stations in Powys
Former Cambrian Railway stations
Railway stations in Great Britain opened in 1861
Railway stations in Great Britain closed in 1965
1861 establishments in Wales
Beeching closures in Wales
1965 disestablishments in Wales